The Fourth World is the second studio album and major label debut by the Los Angeles band Kara's Flowers, who later achieved greater success under the name Maroon 5. The album contains 11 tracks, plus one bonus track on the Japanese edition.

The band, which had previously self-released an album called We Like Digging? (1995), signed with Reprise Records and released The Fourth World album on August 19, 1997. However, the band had little success with the album and parted with the record label two years later.  
 
The band continued to explore different musical styles until finally coming together again with James Valentine under the name Maroon 5.

On January 24, 2020, a limited edition of the album was released, with a marbled blue vinyl.

Singles 
The lead single, "Soap Disco", was released on July 22, 1997. A music video was produced for the single, depicting the group walking through a park and performing in an orange and green room. A storm appears at the end of the video. The video was directed by Mark Kohr (who has directed music videos for Alanis Morissette and Green Day). The video made an airplay on 120 Minutes.

The band made an appearance from the television series Beverly Hills, 90210, where they performed the song in the episode "Forgive and Forget".

Critical reception

Giving the album a B+, Tom Lanham with Entertainment Weekly said the "optimistic, lyrically awkward kids spend 10 more happy tracks turning the tables on lethargic slacker cynicism, with Green Day producer Rob Cavallo bridling all that youthful zeal."

Track listing
Standard edition

Personnel
Kara's Flowers
Adam Levine – lead vocals, lead guitar
Jesse Carmichael – rhythm guitar, backing vocals
Michael Madden – bass
Ryan Dusick – drums, percussion

Additional musician
Roger Joseph Manning, Jr. – keyboard

Production
Mark Agostino – engineer, second engineer
Ken Allardyce – engineer
Billy Bowers – engineer, second engineer
David Campbell – arranger
Rob Cavallo – producer
Adam Day – guitar technician
Jerry Finn – engineer, mixing
Tony Flores – engineer, second engineer
Barry Goldberg – engineer, second engineer
Brandon Harris – engineer, second engineer
Steve Holroyd – engineer
Billy Kinsley – engineer, second engineer
Bob Ludwig – mastering
John Srebalus – engineer, second engineer

References

1997 debut albums
Reprise Records albums
Albums produced by Rob Cavallo
Power pop albums by American artists
Maroon 5 albums